William Ives Budington (April 21, 1815 – November 29, 1879) was an American minister.

Budington was born in New Haven, Conn., April 21, 1815, the son of William and Lydia (Ives) Budington.  He graduated from Yale College in 1834.  After graduating he taught in the academy in New Canaan, Conn., for nearly a year, and then began a three years' course in the Yale Divinity School. The year 1838-9 he spent as a resident licentiate in the Andover Theological Seminary. He was ordained pastor of the First Church (Congregational) in Charlestown, Mass, April 22, 1840, and fulfilled a happy and prosperous ministry there, until reasons connected with an impaired state of health led him to resign the charge, September 22, 1854.  He assumed at once the pastoral care of the Western Presbyterian Church in Philadelphia, Pa., but the death of his wife and other reasons led him to relinquish this position in the following April, when he removed to the Clinton Avenue Congregational Church in Brooklyn, N. Y., over which he was installed, December 19, 1855. His ministry in Brooklyn was from the first highly esteemed, and the office was only laid down on account of the disease from which he died. In 1877 he was attacked with cancer of the lip, which after three operations still reappeared, each time in a more troublesome form. He resigned his pastoral office, December 22, 1878, and died in Brooklyn, November 29, 1879, in his 65th year.

He was married, Jan. 5, 1841, to  Elizabeth L., daughter of William Gunton, of Washington, D C, who died December 24, 1854. He was again married, April 7, 1857, to Elizabeth W. Nicholson, of Canandaigua, N Y, who survived him.  His children, three daughters and two sons by the first marriage, and one son by the second marriage, all survived him.

He published (in 1846) a History of the First Church, Charlestown, also several occasional sermons and review-articles The degree of D.D. was conferred on him by Amherst College in 1856.

External links

1815 births
1879 deaths
Religious leaders from New Haven, Connecticut
Yale Divinity School alumni
Andover Newton Theological School alumni
American Presbyterian ministers
American Congregationalist ministers
Yale College alumni
19th-century American clergy